The legislative districts of Eastern Samar are the representations of the province of Eastern Samar in the various national legislatures of the Philippines. The province is currently represented in the lower house of the Congress of the Philippines through its lone congressional district.

History  
Eastern Samar was represented as the third district of Samar until Republic Act No. 4221 was ratified in November 1965, after which the representative of the third district of Samar automatically served as Eastern Samar's representative. It was part of the representation of Region VIII from 1978 to 1984.

Lone District 
Population (2015): 467,160

Notes

At-large (defunct)

See also 
Legislative districts of Samar

References 

Eastern Samar
Politics of Eastern Samar